Mary P. Dolciani (1923–1985) was an American mathematician, known for her work with secondary-school mathematics teachers.

Education and career
Dolciani earned her Bachelor of Arts degree (B.A.) at Hunter College in New York City, and she completed her doctor of philosophy (Ph.D.) at Cornell University in 1947 with B. W. Jones as thesis advisor. She taught briefly at Vassar College before returning to Hunter, where she spent the next forty years. Dolciani taught mathematics there, and at times, she also served as a Dean or the Provost.

Contributions
Beginning in the 1960s Mary Dolciani wrote a series of high school mathematics textbook, Structure and Method, which in 2000 - 2010 has experienced a resurgence of popularity.

Shortly before her death in 1985, Dolciani also co-wrote (along with two other mathematics educators) Pre-Algebra: An Accelerated Course. This textbook was widely used in the later 1980s through the 1990s. In addition to teaching the pure mathematics, it emphasized the usefulness of algebra in various practical applications.

Although Dolciani is not well known by the general public, she was influential in developing the basic modern method used for teaching basic algebra in the United States (called "Dolciani algebra", which teaches it on the basis of drill like arithmetic, rather than on the basis of proofs as in Euclidean geometry). Dolciani  also popularized the short-form names of the Properties that are familiar to many high school algebra students, e.g. the "Zero Property".

Legacy

The American Mathematical Society publishes a series of mathematical books named for her: The Dolciani Mathematical Expositions. Also, the Mathematical Association of America's headquarters building in Washington D.C. is named The Dolciani Mathematical Center in her honor. The Mathematical Association of America has given the Mary P. Dolciani Award annually since 2012 for distinguished contributions to teaching, and the American Mathematical Society has given a different award, the Mary P. Dolciani Prize for Excellence in Research, every other year beginning in 2019.

In 1982, Dr. Mary P. Dolciani Halloran, with her husband James J. Halloran and Eugene J. Callahan as Trustees, established the Mary P. Dolciani Halloran Foundation to further the study of mathematics and mathematics education.

References

External links
 
 
 
 
 
 

Hunter College alumni
American women mathematicians
20th-century American mathematicians
Cornell University alumni
Vassar College faculty
Hunter College faculty
1985 deaths
1923 births
20th-century women mathematicians
20th-century American women